Ken Lofton may refer to:

Kenny Lofton (born 1967), American former professional baseball player and college basketball player
Kenneth Lofton Jr. (born 2002), American basketball player